The 1995 World Rowing Championships were World Rowing Championships that were held  from 20 to 28 August at Lake Kaukajärvi, Tampere, Finland.

Events
The women's lightweight four (LW4-) was poorly subscribed, with only five nations entering boats; no heats were thus had. The Australian team, although present, did not start. The Danish rower in seat two caught a crab and injured herself, and they did not finish. Therefore, all finishers received a medal, with the team from the United States the overall winners.

Medal summary

Men's events

Women's events

Medal table

References

World Rowing Championships
Rowing Championships
Rowing competitions in Finland
1995 in Finnish sport
1995 in rowing
Sports competitions in Tampere
August 1995 sports events in Europe